The 2017 Italian local elections were held on Sunday 11 June. If necessary, a run-off vote was held on Sunday 25 June. The term of mayors and councils will last five years, unless an early election is triggered.

In the autonomous regions of Trentino-Alto Adige/Südtirol and Aosta Valley the elections will be held on 7 May.

The elections were characterized by a good performance of the centre-right coalition and many losses for the centre-left coalition, which however won in the majority of municipalities with more than 15,000 inhabitants, but lost in the most important cities like Genoa, L'Aquila and Parma; while the Five Star Movement was excluded from the runoffs in all the most important cities.

Voting system

Every municipality with more than 15,000 inhabitants elects its mayor and city council with the same system.

Voters express a direct choice for the mayor or an indirect choice voting for one of the parties of the candidate's coalition. If no candidate receives a majority of votes, the top two candidates go to a second round two weeks later. The coalition of the elected mayor is guaranteed a majority of seats in the council with the attribution of extra seats. If the Mayor resigns, dies, lose a motion of confidence, or a majority of the municipal councillors step down at the same time, an early election (for the Mayor and for all municipal councillors) is called.

The City Council is elected at the same time as the mayor. Voters can vote for a list of candidates and can express up to two preferences for candidates of said list, provided they are selecting candidates of both genders. Seats are then attributed to parties proportionally, and for each party the candidates with the highest number of preferences are elected.

The municipalities with a population of less than 15,000 elect their mayors with a plurality system. A mayoral candidate can be supported by only one list, and the list of the elected mayor gets a two-thirds majority of seats. Voters can express up to two preferences for candidates of the chosen list, provided they are selecting candidates of both genders. Seats are then attributed to the candidates with the highest number of preferences.

Results

Overall results 
Majority of each coalition in 161 municipalities (comuni) with a population higher than 15,000:

Notes: almost all political parties and coalitions in local (municipal and regional) elections usually run with the support of some minor allied list active in local politics forming coalitions under the same nominee as the mayoral candidate, only M5S ran in all elections with a single list (that is the list of M5S under the M5S nominee as the mayoral candidate without forming coalitions with minor local lists or other national parties).

By party 
Party votes in the main municipalities:

By coalition 
Coalition votes in the main municipalities:

Mayoral election results

References

2017 elections in Italy
 
June 2017 events in Italy
 
Municipal elections in Italy